Maurice Cardale Jeffers (born April 3, 1979) is an American former professional basketball player. He is 6'5" in height and weighs 210 pounds. His position is shooting guard and small forward. He was selected in the 2nd Round (55th) pick in the 2001 NBA Draft by the Sacramento Kings, but he has never signed a contract with an NBA team, making him 1 of 8 players from the 2001 NBA Draft to never play a game in the league.

High school and college career 
Jeffers, one of the best players to come from Morrilton High School.  Attended Westark Junior College located in Ft. Smith, Arkansas.  His second season (1998–1999) he averaged 20 points, 9.5 rebounds, 2 assists and 1.1 steals per game. He moved on to college ball at Saint Louis University.  In his senior season (2000–2001) he averaged 16.0 points, 6.1 rebounds, 2.5 assists and 1 steal per game. His season high was 27 points in a (71-61) win over Louisville Cardinals on January 6, 2001.

External links
Player Bio: Maurice Jeffers :: Men's Basketball
Maurice Jeffers D-League Statistics | Basketball-Reference.com

1979 births
Living people
African-American basketball players
American expatriate basketball people in Argentina
American expatriate basketball people in Germany
American expatriate basketball people in Spain
American expatriate basketball people in Switzerland
American men's basketball players
Arkansas–Fort Smith Lions basketball players
Asheville Altitude players
Baloncesto León players
Basketball players from Arkansas
CB Breogán players
CB L'Hospitalet players
Fribourg Olympic players
Giessen 46ers players
Junior college men's basketball players in the United States
Lanús basketball players
People from Morrilton, Arkansas
Sacramento Kings draft picks
Saint Louis Billikens men's basketball players
Shooting guards
21st-century African-American sportspeople
20th-century African-American sportspeople